Hisatake Sugi is a Japanese politician and a member of the House of Councillors of Japan.

Biography 
In 1998, he graduated from Soka University.
He worked as a Certified Public Accountant and in 2006, worked for Price WaterhouseCoopers.

References 

Sōka University alumni
Members of the House of Councillors (Japan)

1976 births

Living people